St. Casimir Lithuanian Roman Catholic Church was a church in Sioux City, Iowa. Sioux City was the second westernmost city in the world to have a Lithuanian church (after Los Angeles). Designed by the architect William L. Steele and built in 1915, the church was demolished in 2007.

History
It was built by the Lithuanian immigrant community of Sioux City in 1915, and served as a neighborhood parish until 1998. Although it was founded as an ethnic parish, members have included Roman Catholics of diverse backgrounds, including Irish, Polish, Italian, and Mexican. The location near the stockyards and meat packing industrial area of the city attracted many of its working-class neighbors. However, during the 1990s, the Diocese of Sioux City forbade St. Casimir parish from enrolling any new members. Then, in 1998 the diocese dissolved the parish, appropriating all holdings and instructing parishioners to join other active parishes. The building, which was deemed eligible for the National Register of Historic Places, was emptied of the fixtures, artwork, and stained glass and left vacant. In May 2007, the diocese made public a plan to raze the structure due to safety concerns. Private interests arranged for the unique dome to be salvaged. The demolition was completed on 17 July 2007.

Architecture
The building was designed by the Prairie School architect William L. Steele, and built by Babue and Co. It incorporated a simplified neo-gothic exterior design, along with a distinctive "bell-cast" dome (cupola) atop the steeple. The interior was extensively decorated by the Lithuanian artist Adolfas Valeška in the early 1950s, including woodwork, a pulpit, stained glass, and several large paintings, among them Our Lady of Fatima, the Good Shepherd, and the Assumption of Mary.  Our Lady of Fatima and the Good Shepherd now reside in St. Joseph Center at the Trinity Heights Marian shrine in Sioux City, along with the European bisque statue of the patron, Saint Casimir, all of which were purchased back from an antiques dealer after having been salvaged from the sanctuary. Other artifacts were hand-picked by the diocese for placement in the newly renovated Cathedral of the Epiphany and Mater Dei grade school.

Former pastors
Fr. Michael Cybulskis 1915–1917
Fr. Joseph Gricius 1917
Fr. John Aleknavicius 1918–1919
Fr. Michael Kolvek 1919–1922
Fr. George G. M. Cesna 1922–1951
Msgr. Simon Morkunas 1951–1990
Fr. Marvin J. Boes 1990–1995
Fr. Paul-Louis Arts 1995–1998

References

External links

Active Sioux City Journal Link
 Also in the Sioux City Journal
 Fox News report
 In the Sioux City Journal
National Register of Historic Places
Cupola down
 Decapitation
 Editorial
Eulogy
Preparation for demolition
 Works by Valeška salvaged from St. Casimir Church. 

Roman Catholic churches in Sioux City, Iowa
Former buildings and structures in Sioux City, Iowa
Former Roman Catholic church buildings in Iowa
Gothic Revival church buildings in Iowa
Lithuanian-American history
Roman Catholic churches completed in 1915
William L. Steele buildings
Demolished buildings and structures in Iowa
Demolished churches in the United States
20th-century Roman Catholic church buildings in the United States
1915 establishments in Iowa
2007 disestablishments in Iowa
Buildings and structures demolished in 2007